Chhangte Lalhriatpuia (born 4 October 1996) is an Indian professional footballer who plays as a midfielder for DSK Shivajians in the I-League.

Career
Born in Mizoram, Lalhriatpuia started his career with DSK Shivajians at the youth level. He made his professional debut for the club on 6 March 2016 against East Bengal in the I-League. He came on in second half stoppage time for Sena Ralte as the club won 2–0.

Career statistics

References

1996 births
Living people
Indian footballers
DSK Shivajians FC players
Association football midfielders
Footballers from Mizoram
I-League players